The Wine Girl is a 1918 American silent drama film directed by Stuart Paton and starring Carmel Myers, Rex De Rosselli and Kenneth Harlan.

Cast
 Carmel Myers as Bona
 Rex De Rosselli as Andrea Minghetti
 E. Alyn Warren as Chico Piave 
 Kenneth Harlan as Frank Harris
 Katherine Kirkwood as Mrs. Harris

References

Bibliography
 Gmür, Leonhard . Rex Ingram: Hollywood's Rebel of the Silver Screen. 2013.

External links
 

1918 films
1918 drama films
1910s English-language films
American silent feature films
Silent American drama films
American black-and-white films
Films directed by Stuart Paton
Universal Pictures films
1910s American films